Advertising supplements periodically accompany corresponding newspapers and are prepared by the paper's advertising staff instead of its editorial staff. It is common for them to cover topics such as real estate and automobiles on behalf of the paper's frequent advertisers.

Some supplements are spin-offs from a newspaper. They are sold separately and typically cover a specific topic, such as the Times Literary Supplement and the Times Educational Supplement

Supplements found on some DVDs, HD DVDs, and Blu-rays are more commonly known as special features, bonus features, or bonus material.

In education, supplemental materials are educational materials designed to accompany or expand on the information presented on course textbooks. These can include printed materials, CDs, websites, or other electronic materials.

In academic publishing, some journals publish supplements, which often either cover an industry-funded conference or are "symposia" on a given topic. These supplements are often subsidized by an external sponsor. Such supplements can have guest editors, are often not peer-reviewed to the same standard as the journal itself, and are more likely to use promotional language. Many journals do not publish sponsored supplements. Small-circulation journals are more likely to publish supplements than large, high-prestige journals. Such supplements create conflicts of interest in academic publishing.

See also
Advertorial
Insert (print advertising)

References

Publications
Publishing